Polycestinae is a subfamily of beetles in the family Buprestidae: known as "jewel beetles".

Tribes and Genera
The following genera are included:

Acmaeoderini

Authority: Kerremans, 1893
subtribe Acmaeoderina Kerremans, 1893
 Acmaeodera Eschscholtz, 1829
 Acmaeoderella Cobos, 1955
 Acmaeoderoides Van Dyke, 1942
 Acmaeoderopsis Barr, 1974
 Anambodera Barr, 1974
 Atacamita Moore, 1985
 Brachmaeodera Volkovitsh & Bellamy, 1992
 Cochinchinula Volkovitsh, 1984
 Microacmaeodera Cobos, 1966
 Squamodera Nelson, 1996
 Thaichinula Volkovitsh, 2008
 Xantheremia Volkovitsh, 1979
subtribe Odetteina Volkovitsh, 2001
 Odettea Baudon, 1966
subtribe Nothomorphina Cobos, 1955
 Acmaeoderoides Van Dyke, 1942
 Nothomorpha Saunders, 1871
 Nothomorphoides Holm, 1986
 Paracmaeoderoides Bellamy & Westcott, 1996

Astraeini
Authority: Cobos, 1980
 Astraeus Laporte & Gory, 1837

Bulini
Authority: Bellamy, 1995; a.k.a. Bulis genus group [tribal level] sensu Volkovitsh, 2001
 Bulis Laporte & Gory, 1837

Haplostethini
Authority: LeConte, 1861
 Ankareus Kerremans, 1894
 Exaesthetus Waterhouse, 1889
 Helferella Cobos, 1957
 Mastogenius Solier, 1849
 Micrasta Kerremans, 1893
 Namibogenius Bellamy, 1996
 Neomastogenius Toyama, 1983
 Pseudotrigonogya Manley, 1986
 Siamastogenius Toyama, 1983
 Trigonogya Schaeffer, 1919

Paratrachyini
Authority: Cobos, 1980; Synonyms: Paratrachini, Paratrachydini, Paratrachysae: all Cobos, 1980

 Paratrachys Saunders, 1873
 Sponsor Gory & Laporte, 1839

Perucolini
Authority: Cobos, 1980
 Perucola Thery, 1925

Polycestini

Authority: Lacordaire, 1857
 Agenjosiana Cobos, 1981
 Aldabrica Cobos, 1981
 Bilyesta Bellamy, 1999
 Castaliella Cobos, 1981
 Cobosesta Holm, 1982
 Jelinekia Cobos, 1981
 Kogania Cobos, 1981
 Madecacesta Descarpentries, 1975
 Madecastalia Descaprentries, 1975
 Micropolycesta Cobos, 1981
 Neopolycesta Kerremans, 1906
 Paracastalia Kerremans, 1902
 Paracmaeoderoides Bellamy & Westcott, 1996
 Parapolycesta Cobos, 1981
 Polycesta Dejean, 1833
 Polycestaxia Cobos, 1981
 Polycestaxis Obenberger, 1920
 Polycestella Kerremans, 1902
 Polycestina Cobos, 1981
 Polycestina Cobos, 1981
 Polycestoides Kerremans, 1902
 Pseudocastalia Kraatz, 1896
 Pseudopolycesta Cobos, 1981
 Strigoptera Dejean, 1833
 Strigopteroides Cobos, 1981
 Thurntaxisia Schatzmayr, 1929
subtribe Xenopseina Volkovitsh, 2008
 Kurosawaxia Descarpentries, 1986
 Theryola Nelson, 1997
 Sommaia Toyama, 1985
 Xenopsis Saunders, 1867 (synonym Paraxenopsis Cobos, 1980)

Polyctesini

Authority: Cobos, 1955
 Bellamyina Bily, 1994
 Polycestis Marseul, 1865
 Schoutedeniastes Burgeon, 1941
 Svatactesis Volkovitsh, 2016

Prospherini
Authority: Cobos, 1980
 Blepharum Thomson, 1878
 Hiperleptodema Bellamy, 1998
 Prospheres Saunders, 1868

Ptosimini

Authority: Kerremans, 1902
 Ptosima Dejean, 1833
 Richtersveldia Bellamy, 2005

Thrincopygini
Authority: LeConte, 1861
 Beerellus Nelson, 1982
 Chrysophana LeConte, 1860
 Thrincopyge LeConte, 1858

Tyndarini
Authority: Cobos, 1955
 Ancylotela Waterhouse, 1882
 Neocypetes Cobos, 1973
 Ocypetes Saunders, 1871
 Bordonia Cobos, 1980
 Paraancylotela Cobos, 1959
 Paratyndaris Fisher, 1919
 Pelycothorax Bellamy & Westcott, 1996
 Tyndaris Thomson, 1857
 Hayekina Cobos, 1980
 Mimicoclytrina Bellamy, 2003
 Tyndarimorpha Moore & Dieguez, 2006
 Pseudacherusia Bellamy, 2005

Xyroscelini
Authority: Cobos, 1955
 Xyroscelis Saunders, 1868

References

Beetle subfamilies